Starfish was a New Zealand fashion label created by Laurie Foon in 1993. Core values for the label included eco-friendly and sustainable practices, as well as community mindedness.

The label was called Jive Junkies from 1991-1993, and garments were sold at Wellington's Wakefield Market. Due to the success of Jive Junkies, the Starfish boutique was opened in Willis Street in 1993. A second Starfish shop was subsequently opened in Auckland.

In 2007, Starfish was awarded the NZ Sustainable Business Award.

References

External links
 Collection of objects from the Starfish archive from Te Papa Collection's Online https://collections.tepapa.govt.nz/agent/46481

Clothing companies of New Zealand